Willcox may refer to:
Willcox, Arizona, a city in the United States
Willcox AVA, an American Viticultural Area in Arizona
Willcox (surname), people with the surname Willcox

See also
Wilcox (surname)
Wilcox (disambiguation)
Willcocks